The A. D. German Warehouse is a Frank Lloyd Wright designed Mayan Revival warehouse that was constructed in Richland Center, Wisconsin in 1921. Wright was born in Richland Center in 1867. The building is on the National Register of Historic Places.

The design of the warehouse resulted from a required bill payment to Albert Delvino German by Wright. Designed as a warehouse for "storing and selling wholesale goods" the space was to include a "teahouse restaurant, retail shops, and an art gallery." Construction on the building began in 1917 with completion in 1921. Facing one of the main streets in Richland Center, the building is mostly concrete, veneered in brick with a Mayan-inspired concrete frieze "derived from masks of the rain-god Chac".

The building exceeded its original construction estimate and later housed a gift shop, tearoom, art gallery and the Frank Lloyd Wright Museum under then-owner Harvey Glazner. Glazner, who died in March 2011, had kept the lower floor of the building as the shop and Frank Lloyd Wright Museum, but the building was not consistently open to the public.

In November 2015, the A.D. German Warehouse Conservancy (ADGWC) retained the services of Isthmus Architecture, Inc., preservation specialists from Madison, Wisconsin. A condition assessment was performed and preservation plan was created for the building in 2017.

Tours of the building are available May–October by appointment through the ADGWC.

Gallery

References

 Storrer, William Allin. The Frank Lloyd Wright Companion. University Of Chicago Press, 2006,  (S.183)

External links

A.D.German Warehouse Conservancy website
The page on the A.D. German Warehouse from Wright in Wisconsin
AD German Warehouse Conservancy - Facebook site
A. D. German Warehouse Summer 2012 on detroityes.com
A. D. German Warehouse on bluffton.edu
Photos on Flickr
A. D. German Warehouse on peterbeers.net
A. D. German Warehouse on dgunning.org

A.D. German Warehouse on Travel Wisconsin - includes interior photographs

Buildings and structures in Richland County, Wisconsin
Frank Lloyd Wright buildings
Buildings and structures completed in 1921